Aurora (minor planet designation: 94 Aurora) is one of the largest main-belt asteroids. With an albedo of only 0.04, it is darker than soot, and has a primitive composition consisting of carbonaceous material. It was discovered by J. C. Watson on September 6, 1867, in Ann Arbor, and named after Aurora, the Roman goddess of the dawn.

This asteroid is orbiting the Sun with a period of 5.62 years and a relatively low eccentricity of 0.092. It is spinning with a rotation period of 7.22 hours. Observations of an occultation using nine chords indicate an oval outline of 225×173 km. The asteroid's pole of rotation lies just 4–16° away from the plane of the ecliptic.

References

External links
 
 

Background asteroids
Aurora
Aurora
CP-type asteroids (Tholen)
C-type asteroids (SMASS)
18670906
Objects observed by stellar occultation
Aurora (mythology)